John C. Sigler  (born 1945) is an American lawyer, gun rights activist, former chair of the Republican State Committee of Delaware and former president of the National Rifle Association (NRA).

Sigler graduated from Milford High School in 1964 and attended Appalachian State Teacher's College. He earned a bachelors degree in criminal justice administration from Wilmington College in 1981, a Master of Business Administration from Central Michigan University, and a Juris Doctor from Widener University School of Law in 1987. He retired as a captain and subsequently worked as a lawyer.

Sigler joined the NRA in 1970 and was elected to the board of directors in 1996. He was named president at the 2007 annual meeting in St. Louis, succeeding Sandra Froman to become the 59th president of the organization. He served two terms and was succeeded by Ron Schmeits in 2009.

In 2013, Sigler abruptly resigned as chair of the Delaware Republican Party.

References

1945 births
Living people
Appalachian State University alumni
Delaware Republicans
State political party chairs of Delaware
Presidents of the National Rifle Association
American gun rights activists
American municipal police officers
Delaware lawyers
Maryland lawyers
United States Navy sailors
Widener University alumni
Wilmington University alumni
Central Michigan University alumni
People from Dover, Delaware